Sam Yagan (born April 10, 1977) is an American Internet entrepreneur best known as the co-founder of OkCupid. In 2013, he was named to TIME Magazine's '100 Most Influential People in the World' list. He is the Vice-Chairman of the e-dating site Match.com.

Family and education 
Yagan is the son of Syrian immigrants, Al and Dr. Haifa Yagan, and grew up in Bourbonnais, Illinois, and studied at the Illinois Math and Science Academy and eventually Harvard University.

Yagan holds a bachelor's degree in Applied Mathematics and Economics from Harvard University and an MBA from Stanford University, where he earned distinction as a Siebel Scholar, an Arjay Miller Scholar, and the Henry Ford Scholar, the award granted to each class’s valedictorian. His brother Danny Yagan is an economics professor at the University of California, Berkeley. His wife Jessica Droste Yagan is the CEO of Impact Engine, an impact investing fund.

Career

SparkNotes 

In 1999, during his senior year at Harvard, Yagan and two of his classmates, Chris Coyne and Max Krohn, started the online study guide SparkNotes. Christian Rudder joined shortly after the founding.  A year later they sold the company to Barnes & Noble for $30 million.

eDonkey, Inc. 

By age 25, Yagan was the president of eDonkey (founded in 2002), a P2P file-sharing network. As the developer of eDonkey, Yagan testified before the Senate Judiciary Committee expressing a need for balance between innovation and intellectual property.

OkCupid 

In 2003, Yagan again teamed up with his Harvard classmates Chris Coyne and Max Krohn and founded OkCupid.

Excelerate Labs 

In 2009, Yagan and Troy Henikoff founded Excelerate Labs.

IAC 

In 2011, Yagan sold his dating website (OkCupid) to IAC for $50 million and in 2012, Yagan became the CEO of Match.com (a subsidiary of IAC).

ShopRunner

Yagan is currently CEO of ShopRunner, an e-commerce network that provides two-day shipping across multiple merchants.

Honors and recognition

Time 100 

In April 2013, Yagan was listed as one of TIME Magazine's '100 Most Influential People in the World'.

Fortune Magazine's 40 Under 40 
In 2014, Yagan was listed as one of Fortune Magazine's "40 Under 40."

Crain's "40 Under 40" 

In 2011, Yagan was named to Crain's "40 under 40" in Chicago.

Personal life 

Sam Yagan is married to his high school sweetheart, Jessica Droste Yagan.

References

External links 
Profile at IAC

Living people
1977 births
Harvard School of Engineering and Applied Sciences alumni
Stanford Graduate School of Business alumni
American people of Syrian descent
American technology chief executives
People from Bourbonnais, Illinois
American technology company founders
Syrian businesspeople